The United States Naval Academy Chapel in Annapolis, Maryland, is one of two houses of worship on the grounds of the Navy's service academy. Protestant and Catholic services are held there. The Naval Academy Chapel is a focal point of the Academy and the city of Annapolis. The chapel is an important feature which led to the Academy being designated a National Historic Landmark in 1961.

Traditionally, new third-class midshipmen become "Youngsters" when they sight the chapel dome upon returning from their summer cruise.

History

The Naval Academy Chapel was designed by Ernest Flagg. The cornerstone was laid in 1904 by Admiral George Dewey and the dedication of the Chapel was on May 28, 1908.

In 1940, the Chapel underwent remodeling which doubled the seating capacity to 2,500, to accommodate a larger brigade of midshipmen. From 1853 to 1972, chapel attendance was compulsory. After remodeling, the chapel formed a large cross.

In 1995, the Chapel was featured on a U.S. Postal Service postage stamp, honoring the Academy's 150th anniversary.

In 2009, nearly seventy years after the 1940 renovation and expansion, the chapel underwent an extensive restoration that included the repair of decades-long deterioration. The cost of the project was nearly $2.5 million, of which $925,000 was donated by the Class of 1969 to cover the cost of replacing the hardwood floors and refinishing the pews. The remaining $2.3 million came from the government.

Architectural features
The two stained-glass windows facing the altar are symbolic. One is of Sir Galahad holding his sheathed sword, portraying the ideals of the naval service. The other signifies the Commission Invisible, a beacon each new officer must follow: Christ is pointing him toward the flag. Four other windows are memorials to LCDR Theodorus B.M. Mason and Admirals David Dixon Porter, David Farragut, and William T. Sampson. Several of the stained-glass windows in the Chapel were designed by Frederick Wilson.

The United States Naval Academy Chapel boasts a 268-rank organ controlled by one of the largest drawknob consoles in the world (522 drawknobs).

Beneath the main chapel is the crypt of John Paul Jones. There is also a small chapel of St. Andrew, which has been used for smaller weddings.

John Paul Jones Crypt

In the deck around the crypt are inscribed the names of his ships: Bonhomme Richard, Alliance, Serapis, Ariel, Alfred, Providence, and Ranger.

See also
Commodore Uriah P. Levy Center and Jewish Chapel (USNA)
United States Navy Chaplain Corps
United States Air Force Academy Cadet Chapel (including Catholic, Jewish, and Protestant chapels)
United States Military Academy Chapel (Protestant)
Chapel of the Most Holy Trinity (West Point) (Catholic)
United States Merchant Marine Academy#Mariners' Memorial Chapel

Footnotes

External links

USNA Chaplain Center webpage
Midshipmen Religious Organizations. USNA Chaplain Center webpage. Retrieved 2010-03-18.
Chapel Organ. USNA Music Department webpage. Retrieved 2010-03-18.
Weddings in the USNA Chapel. USNA Chaplain Center webpage. Retrieved 2010-03-18.
John Paul Jones Crypt
USNA 150th-anniversary U.S. postage stamp. USNA website

Christianity in Annapolis, Maryland
United States Naval Academy buildings and structures

Military chapels of the United States 
University and college chapels in the United States
Churches in Anne Arundel County, Maryland
Religious buildings and structures in Annapolis, Maryland
Churches completed in 1908
20th-century churches in the United States
1908 establishments in Maryland